Becky Martin is a British television director and producer. Among her directorial credits are episodes of Peep Show, Pete versus Life, Getting On, Veep, Succession  and Avenue 5. In 2017, Martin won the Directors Guild of America Award for Outstanding Directorial Achievement in a Comedy Series for "Inauguration", Veeps season-five finale.

Martin directed Peep Show series four to nine. In 2010, series six was nominated for the British Academy Television Award for Best Situation Comedy,<ref>{{cite news |url=http://www.bafta.org:80/awards/television/television-awards-nominations-in-2010,1095,BA.html#jump19 |year=2010 |access-date=13 June 2017 |title=Television Awards Winners in 2010 . |archiveurl=https://web.archive.org/web/20100701002923/http://www.bafta.org/awards/television/television-awards-nominations-in-2010%2C1095%2CBA.html#jump19 |archive-date=1 July 2010 |url-status=dead |publisher=British Academy of Film and Television Arts |via=Wayback Machine }}</ref> and series nine was nominated in 2016 in the "Scripted Comedy" category.  She also directed the 2007 Comedy Showcase installment Ladies and Gentlemen''.

References

External links
 

Living people
British television directors
Year of birth missing (living people)
Place of birth missing (living people)
British women television directors